"Alabam" is a 1960 song written and performed by Cowboy Copas.

Chart performance
"Alabam" was the most successful release of Cowboy Copas and was his only single to hit the Hot 100, peaking at number sixty-three.  On the country chart, "Alabam" was the sole number one single for Cowboy Copas, staying at the top spot for twelve weeks and spending thirty-four weeks on the chart.

Cover versions
Guy Mitchell released a cover version in 1968.  It reached No. 61 on the Hot Country Songs chart.
Minnie Pearl in 1966
Lynn Anderson in 1970
Pat Boone
Willie Nelson
Bobby Vinton
Hank Williams Jr.

References

1960 songs
1960 singles
Cowboy Copas songs
Guy Mitchell songs
Songs written by Cowboy Copas
Starday Records singles